The SIIMA Award for Best Director – Malayalam is an award, begun in 2012, presented annually at the South Indian International Movie Awards to a director via viewers and the winner is announced at the ceremony. The nominations for the category are given by the jury members.

Superlatives

Winners and nominees

Notes

References 

South Indian International Movie Awards
Awards for best director
Lists of Indian film directors